"Welcome to the 60's" is a song from the 2002 musical Hairspray. it is performed by Tracy Turnblad, Edna Turnblad, Mr. Pinky, and a Greek chorus consisting of three African-American stylists entitled the Dynamites.

Production
DVD Talk wrote  and Wittman's songs come from specific lines of dialog, like "Welcome to the 60's" and "Big, Blonde and Beautiful," a nice way of simply expanding on what Waters' characters were already saying".

Synopsis
Edna Turnblad is encouraged to go outside for the first time in a while, and she takes in the surroundings. It is a changing world where it is okay to be black or fat. Tracy says: "people who are different, their time is coming". In the process she cures her mother's agoraphobia, and gets a job as a spokesperson for Mr. Pinky. In the film, the song "features a Supremes-style trio stepping down from a billboard to rouse the willing kids".

Analysis
The Column Awards wrote the song had "the sense of a woman who is recognizing her own power", and symbolised "Edna's coming out, so to speak". The site also suggested the song shows Tracy's 
"transformation". Stranded at the Drive-In: The 100 Best Teen Movies argues the song "becomes an embrace of everyone different, including the black, the freaky, the (by implication) gay . . . and the fat. the song and its staging insiststhat everyone has a chance to, literally, come out and be visible in this brave new world".

Hollywood Catwalk: Exploring Costume and Transformation in American Film interpreted the song in regard to Edna's transformation:

Critical reception
In Newsweekly described the song as "weighty", and wrote that Edna "undergoes a hefty makeover and simply steals the show." EDGEboston said "the coda to Welcome to the Sixties, is given a big, Dreamgirls-like finish". Theater Mirror suggested the song features "three gals...singing and strutting like the Supremes". UK Theatre dubbed The Dynamites a "mock Supremes trio". Reviewing the film, Dominica Life wrote "It took me a while to warm up to Hairspray.  But, when Tracy, Edna and a host of others take to the streets in the great dance number, “Welcome to the 60’s,” I was hooked". Chicago Critic described it as "MoTown revisited". Ey Jacksonville described the song as a "crowd favorite, “Welcome to the 60’s, adding "this song will have you dancing in your seat!". Dayton Most Metro called it "flavorfully decade-inspired", and said it was fueled by "Motown essence". Ithaca.com described the number as "splendid", and Alpharetta said the song is "rousing". Playbill described it as a "tuneful and surprisingly touching duet".

References

Songs from Hairspray (musical)
Songs written by Marc Shaiman
Songs written by Scott Wittman
2002 songs